Howard M. Norton (May 30, 1911 – March 12, 1994) was an American journalist whose work won a Pulitzer Prize.

Howard Norton was born in Haverhill, Massachusetts. He grew up in Florida, and he attended the University of Florida for college.  In 1933, he graduated with a bachelor's degree in journalism.  After graduation, he moved to Baltimore and became a Foreign correspondent for The Baltimore Sun.

Norton wrote a series of articles "dealing with the administration of unemployment compensation in Maryland, resulting in convictions and pleas of guilty in criminal court of 93 persons." His work won the 1947 Pulitzer Prize for Public Service for The Baltimore Sun.

Norton died of a stroke in Wilmington, North Carolina on March 12, 1994.

Awards
 Pulitzer Prize for Public Service – 1947, The Baltimore Sun, "for its series of articles by Howard M. Norton dealing with the administration of unemployment compensation in Maryland, resulting in convictions and pleas of guilty in criminal court of 93 persons"
 Alumni of Distinction, University of Florida – 1979

References

Other sources
 "Howard Norton Dies; Pulitzer Prize Winner", The Washington Post, March 13, 1994. Archived 2011-06-05. Retrieved 2013-10-28. — lead paragraph at Bookrags HighBeam
 1979 Alumni of Distinction, College of Journalism and Communications, University of Florida

External links 

 Howard M. Norton papers at the University of Maryland libraries

1911 births
1994 deaths
American male journalists
20th-century American journalists
The Baltimore Sun people
University of Florida College of Journalism and Communications alumni
People from Florida
Place of birth missing
20th-century American non-fiction writers
20th-century American male writers